Doğanyol is a district of Malatya Province of Turkey. The mayor is Hakan Bay (AKP).

Demographics 
The town is populated by Kurds.

History 
Doğanyol has become district in 1990 during Turgut Özal presidency. Doğanyol is 90 km far away to Malatya city center. Doğanyol has 16 neighborhoods. They are Çolak, İshak, Akkent, Behramlı, Burç, Damlı, Gevheruşağı, Gökçe, Gümüşsu, Koldere, Konurtay, Mezra, Poyraz, Ulutaş, Yalınca, Yeşilköy.

In 2018 the population of Doğanyol was 4420.

On 24 Jan 2020 the town was impacted by a magnitude 6.7 earthquake.

References

Populated places in Malatya Province
Populated places on the Euphrates River
Districts of Malatya Province

Kurdish settlements in Turkey